X Factor is a Romanian television music competition that aims to find a new music talent to become a star. The fourth season began airing on 19 September 2014 on Antena 1.

The hosts are the same as in the first three seasons: Răzvan Simion and Dani Oțil, who are also known for hosting a well known morning show on Antena 1. Singer Delia Matache returned to the judging panel, while Horia Brenciu and Ștefan Bănică, Jr. joined the panel as replacements for the departing judges.

On December 26, 2014, the season concluded with Adina Răducan winning the Final, she was mentored by Brenciu. Alexandra Crișan, mentored by Bănică finished in second place.

Auditions

Audition process was based on the British and American version. First up were "The Producer's Audition", where the producers chose singers to proceed to the second phase which was "The Audition before the Judging panel". The first auditions took place at Craiova, on 24 May.  They then took place in Sibiu, on 26 May, in Arad, on May 28 in Cluj Napoca on May 30, 2014, on June 2 in Iași, on June 5 in Galați and concluded on June 7, 2013 in Bucharest.

Judges
In February 2014, rumours began circulating that Cheloo would not be returning for the fourth series, because of his aggressive behavior. When it was announced that The X Factor would be returning for a fourth season, Dan Bittman was linked to the role. In May 2014, it was confirmed that Delia Matache would return. Before the auditions began, Cheloo and Bittman were replaced by pop singer Horia Brenciu and rock star Ștefan Bănică, Jr.

Bootcamp

Complete Teams

Color key
 – Eliminated in Six-chair challenge
 – Eliminated in Duels
 – Finalist
 – Wildcard

Six-chair challenge
For this season of The X Factor, the producers confirmed that the boot camp and judges' houses sections of the competition, which traditionally followed the audition rounds, had been dropped and replaced with a brand new stage called "The Six-Chair challenge".

This season, the categories follow the age-based format from season three. Brenciu mentored the Under 20s, Bănică the Over 20s and for the second time, Matache mentored the Groups.

Before the Six-chair challenge began, Vlad Simon left the competition because of health problems. Simon was replaced by Florin Șchiopu.

Color key
 – Contestant was immediately eliminated after performance without switch
 – Contestant was switched out later in the competition and eventually eliminated
 – Contestant was not switched out and made the final six of their own category

The Duels
After the Six-chair challenge, each mentor had six contestants for the Duels. The contestants were not told who they were up against until the day of the Duels. Each contestant sang a song of their own choice, back to back, and each duel concluded with the respective mentor eliminating one of the two contestants; the three winners for each mentor advanced to the Live shows.

Colour key:

 - Artist won the Duel and advanced to the Live shows

 - Artist lost the Duel and was eliminated

Notes
  1. Daniel was not present in the "Six-Chair Challenge", due to a personal problem.
  2. After the performances of Monica and Adina from the Under 20s category, their mentor, Brenciu couldn't decide between both of them, so the producers decided that Brenciu's decision will be taken after all his acts perform.

Wildcard
It was announced on 3 December 2014 that there would be a wildcard twist on the live shows. The judges selected the wildcard acts from other categories. The wildcard acts were announced in the first live show with Sergiu Braga chosen by Brenciu for the Under 20s category, Alessio Paddeu chosen by Matache for the Groups and Miruna Buză chosen by Bănică for the Over 20s category.

Finalists

The final 12 finalists were confirmed as follows:

Color Key
 – Winner
 – Runner-up
 – Third place

Live shows
The live shows will have a change in this season. Only four live shows will take place. In the first two live shows, each category will have its own final showdown, the result of which is decided solely by its mentor. The outcome of the third show will only rely on the public vote and will have two eliminations (one of which will happen halfway through of the show, when the voting will have been frozen). The final will have four contestants. Two of the finalists will be eliminated halfway through the final show, when the voting will have been frozen. The winner is still determined by the public vote.

Results summary

Color key

Live show details

Week 1 (December 5)
 Theme:  Romanian music
 Musical guests: Ștefan Bănică, Jr. (Medley from: ( "Am Uitat", "Ziua", "Bubulina Gospodina", "O Seară De Mai"), "Alerg Printre Stele", "S-o Facem Lată")

Judges' votes to eliminate
 Brenciu: Monica Sannino, stated that he will go further, in the contest, with the most spectacular act.
 Matache: R-Twins, gave no reason.
 Bănică : Miruna Buză, stated that he saw more determination in the other act.

Week 2 (December 12)
 Theme: Famous Voices
 Group performance(s): Medley from: ("Happy", "Bang Bang", "Baby Don't Lie")
 Musical guests: Horia Brenciu ("Hello", "Inima Nu Vrea", "Azi Am Chef De Mare", "Seara Ta De Crăciun", "Fac Ce-Mi Spune Inima")
 Judge guest : Cristian Minculescu

Judges' votes to eliminate
 Brenciu: Cristian Goaie, Brenciu stated that with the other act, he will win the contest.
 Matache: Contrast
 Bănică : Alexandru Florea, Bănică stated that he will go further with the act, that he thinks, will make a career in music.

Week 3 (December 19)
First Round

 Theme: Duets
 Group performance(s): Medley from: ("Wiggle", "Shake It Off", "Can't Hold Us")
 Musical guests: Delia Matache ("Pe Aripi De Vânt" feat. Florin Ristei, "Cine Iubește Și Lasă")

Second Round

 Theme: Semifinal
 Musical Guests : Delia Matache

Week 4: Final (December 26)

Round 1
Theme: Final
Group performance(s):  "All I Want for Christmas Is You"
Musical guests: What's Up - "Taxi", Corul Naţional de Cameră "Madrigal" - Carols Medley

Round 2
Theme: Final
Musical guests: Voltaj - "De La Capăt"

Ratings

Controversy
In the "Six-chair challenge", Brenciu shocks everyone, even the presenters, by eliminating Miruna Buză, a girl with "excellent vocal technique". Despite getting great reviews from the other mentors, the girl received unexpected criticism from her mentor : "I thought you will surprise us today with something else...Miruna, you have to go home".

References

X Factor (Romanian TV series)
Romania 04
2014 Romanian television seasons
Antena 1 (Romania) original programming